Powiat świdnicki may refer to either of two counties (powiats) in Poland:
Świdnica County, in Lower Silesian Voivodeship (SW Poland)
Świdnik County, in Lublin Voivodeship (E Poland)